The 14 January 2012 Basra bombing was a paramilitary attack in the port city of Basra, Iraq. A bomb, seemingly targeting Shia Muslims marking the festival of Arbain, killed at least 53 people and left more than 130 injured.

Attacks
The bomb exploded among crowds of Shia pilgrims at a security checkpoint in the city. The pilgrims were passing through the checkpoint on their way to a major Shia mosque in the Az Zubayr district, about 20km (12 miles) south-west of Basra. There were conflicting reports about the cause of the explosion, with some saying that a suicide bomber dressed as a police officer managed to reach the checkpoint after showing a fake ID card. Other reports blamed a powerful roadside bomb that had been planted close to the road. The attack occurred on the last of the 40 days of Arbain, where hundreds of thousands of Shia pilgrims visit the city of Kerbala and other holy sites. Security forces sealed off the main hospital after the attack, fearing further violence.

Following the attack, the Iraqi military "intensified" its security around the country. 30,000 Iraqi soldiers were deployed in Karbala to protect pilgrims. Officials believe at least 16 million pilgrims have passed through the city of Karbala in the past two weeks.

Other attacks took place throughout Iraq that day. Roadside bombings in Mosul, Baqubah and Al-Karmah left one policeman dead and at least nine people injured. A car bombing targeting a police patrol in Tikrit killed a bystander and injured two officers.

Responsibility
Ali Ghanim, the chief of the security committee in Basra, said the attack was carried out by a suicide bomber. He said, "There was a man who was holding a box and giving food to people, and one of our security officers found him suspicious and went to search the box and the man blew himself up".
So far, no group has claimed responsibility for the attack.

See also
 List of terrorist incidents, January–June 2012

References 

2012 murders in Iraq
21st-century mass murder in Iraq
Mass murder in 2012
Suicide bombings in Iraq
Terrorist incidents in Iraq in 2012
Shia–Sunni sectarian violence
Violence against Shia Muslims in Iraq
History of Basra
January 2012 events in Iraq